The Pacification of Ukrainians in Eastern Galicia was a punitive action against the Ukrainian minority in Poland, carried out by police and military of the Second Polish Republic from September until November 1930 in reaction to a wave of sabotage and terrorist attacks perpetrated by Ukrainian nationalists.

It took place in 16 Polish counties of three southeastern voivodeships. This area was in the interbellum part of the so-called Eastern Lesser Poland province. Therefore, in Ukrainian and Polish literature this event is called "Pacification in Eastern Galicia" and "Pacification of Eastern Galicia" or "Pacification of Eastern Lesser Poland", respectively.

Background
Eastern Galicia, about equally populated by Poles and Ukrainians, east of the Curzon line, was incorporated into the Second Polish Republic after Austria-Hungary's collapse and the defeat of the short-lived West Ukrainian People's Republic. After the war, in 1920–1921, approximately 100,000 Ukrainians were interred in concentration camps by the Polish government, where they were often denied food and medicine; some of them died from starvation, disease or suicide. The victims included not only soldiers and officers but also priests, lawyers and doctors who had supported the Ukrainian cause. The death toll at these camps from diseases was estimated at 20,000 people (during the war, the Ukrainian government had interred 25,000 Poles).

Many Ukrainian organizations continued close contact with the Weimar Republic, later Nazi Germany, while others kept in contact with the new Soviet government to the east. The Ukrainian language was banned in government agencies in 1924 and support was steadily withdrawn from Ukrainian schools. Polish-Ukrainian relations deteriorated during the Great Depression, leading to much economic disruption, hitting hard, particularly the rural areas. In this atmosphere, radical Ukrainian nationalists propagating active resistance to Polish domination found a ready response from Ukrainian youth.

In July 1930, activists of the extremist Organization of Ukrainian Nationalists (OUN) began sabotage actions, during which warehouses and cereal fields owned by Poles were burned, Polish homes were destroyed, bridges were blown up, state institutions, rail lines and telephone connections were damaged. The organizer of the action was Yevhen Konovalets. Financing was provided and weaponry was illegally smuggled with Weimar German support.

The main reason behind the sabotage campaign was the mainstream Ukrainian parties' decision to participate in the Polish elections, coupled with Józef Piłsudski's policy of tolerance, which threatened the OUN's position in Ukrainian society. The organization reacted by adopting a tactic designed to radicalize Ukrainian public opinion and block any form of compromise with Polish authorities. The OUN used terrorism and sabotage in order to force the Polish government into reprisals so fierce that they would cause the more moderate Ukrainian groups ready to negotiate with the Polish state to lose support. OUN directed its violence not only against the Poles but also against all Ukrainians wishing for a peaceful settlement of the Polish-Ukrainian conflict.

Over time, local Ukrainians, many of whom saw the Poles as occupiers of their land, joined the action. Offices of the Polish paramilitary Riflemen's Association were burned, as were the stands of the popular trade fairs in Lwów (Lviv). Government offices and mail trucks were attacked. This situation lasted until September, with some sporadic incidents happening as late as November. The terror action was limited to Galicia, and did not take place in Volhynia.

In response, Polish authorities decided to pacify the turbulent province. The decision to carry out the action was made by Marshal Józef Piłsudski in his capacity as Prime Minister of the Second Polish Republic. Recognizing that terrorist actions carried out by the OUN did not amount to an insurrection, Piłsudski ordered a police action, rather than a military one, and deputized the Minister of Interior, Felicjan Sławoj Składkowski with its organization. Sławoj Składkowski in turn ordered regional police commanders to prepare for it in the Lwów Voivodeship, Stanisławów Voivodeship and Tarnopol Voivodeship. The commander of the planned action was Lwów Voivodeship's chief of police, Czesław Grabowski.

Before the action commenced, around 130 Ukrainian activists, including a few dozen former Sejm (Polish parliament) deputies were arrested. The action itself began on 14 September 1930, in several villages of Lwów Voivodeship, where the 14th Jazlowiec Uhlan Regiment was directed, even though the detailed plan for the action was not established until 18 September.

Forces involved
From 20 to 29 September, 17 companies of police (60 policemen each) were used. Of these, 9 came from the police academy in Mosty Wielkie (Velyki Mosty), 3 from Lwów Voivodeship, 2.5 from Stanisławów Voivodeship, 2.5 from Tarnopol Voivodeship (a total of 1,041 policemen and officers). The main operations with the participation of military units took place in the first half of October.

Overall, the action affected:
Lwów Voivodeship: police action - 206 places in 9 different counties, military action - 78 places in 8 different counties.
Stanisławów Voivodeship: police action - 56 places in 2 counties, military action - 33 places in one county
Tarnopol Voivodeship - police action - 63 places in 4 counties, military action - 57 places in 5 counties.

Or in total 494 villages. Timothy Snyder and other sources give the figure of 1000 policemen used in the operation, affecting 450 villages.

Nature of the action
The operation was carried out in three stages. First, a basic edict was issued authorizing a particular action. Second, police units were brought in. Third units of the regular army carried out "operational maneuvers".

The pacification involved the search of private homes as well as buildings in which Ukrainian organizations (including the Ukrainian Greek Catholic Church) were based. During the search, the buildings, belongings, and property of Ukrainians were destroyed and the inhabitants were often beaten and arrested. Several Ukrainian schools (in Rohat, Drohobycz, Lwów, Tarnopol and Stanisławów) were closed and the Ukrainian Youth Scout organization Plast was delegalized. On 10 September, five deputies of Ukrainian National Democratic Alliance were arrested.

The pacification was carried out by first surrounding a village with police units, then calling out the village elder or an administrator of the village. He in turn was informed about the purpose of the operation and was ordered to give up any weapons or explosives hidden in the village. All villagers were to remain in their houses. Subsequently, the houses of those suspected of cooperation with Organization of Ukrainian Nationalists were searched, which included the tearing up of floors and ceilings. During the course of the search, the furniture and property inside the houses were often destroyed. Policemen found about 100 kilograms of explosives and weapons (1287 rifles, 566 revolvers, 31 grenades). Also, during the searches, physical force was used and many people were beaten. According to Polish historian Władysław Pobóg-Malinowski, there were no fatalities, while, according to Ukrainian historian Petro Mirchuk, 35 Ukrainian civilians died during the pacification. Stephan Horak estimates the number of victims at 7. Additional punishments included levying special "contributions" on the villages and stationing regiments of cavalry in the village, which had to be fed and quartered by the villages.

Ukrainian nationalists lodged an official complaint regarding the "pacification" action to a committee of the League of Nations, which in its response disapproved the methods used by the Polish authorities, but also put blame on the Ukrainian extremist elements for consciously provoking this reaction from the Polish government. The committee concluded that the pacification did not constitute the governmental policy of persecution of the Ukrainian minority.

Effects of the action
One of the unintended consequences of the action, from the point of view of Polish authorities, was that previously allegedly "moderately oriented" Ukrainians became radicalized, and even those who had previously felt loyalty to the Polish state began supporting separation. The OUN continued its terroristic activities and engaged in numerous assassinations. Some of those murdered by the OUN after the Pacification included Tadeusz Hołówko, a Polish promoter of Ukrainian/Polish compromise, Emilian Czechowski, Lwów's Polish police commissioner, Alexei Mailov, a Soviet consular official killed in retaliation for the Holodomor, and most notably Bronisław Pieracki, the Polish interior minister.  The OUN also killed moderate Ukrainian figures such as the respected teacher (and former officer of the Ukrainian Galician Army of the West Ukrainian People's Republic) Ivan Babij.

According to Ukrainian-Canadian historian, Orest Subtelny, "collective punishment" meted out on thousands of "mostly innocent peasants" resulted in the exacerbation of animosity between the Polish state and the Ukrainian minority.

Notes

References

1930 in Poland
Conflicts in 1930
Poland–Ukraine relations
Second Polish Republic
Political repression
Massacres of Ukrainians by Poles